The Pignone mod.43 were bakelite cased Italian anti-tank blast mines used during the Second World War in North Africa and Italy.

History 
Although the mines had plastic cases, they had a number of metal components, rendering them detectable to mine detectors.

Post WW2 Development 
The Pignone P-1 and Pignone P-2 were plastic cased Italian anti-tank blast mines.

The P-1 has circular plate like body 33.5 centimeters in diameter and 14 centimeters high with a central raised pressure plate. The P-1 uses a  main charge of TNT.

The P-2 has a circular bowl like body 33 centimeters in diameter and 12.7 centimeters high. It uses a smaller  TNT charge.

The downward movement of the fuze ruptures the shear pins freeing the head of the fuze. The fuze head continues downwards, compressing a rubber cylinder which presses down on the striker assembly until two retaining balls are released. The striker is then pushed by a spring into a percussion cap which triggers a booster followed by the main charge.

References

 Landmine and Countermine Warfare, North Africa, 1940-1943

Anti-tank mines of Italy